Joseph Curtis Urbon (born March 6, 1968) is an American sports agent and former professional baseball player.  He is a Co-Head of Baseball at CAA Sports.

Background

Urbon is a native of Seattle, Washington, and played baseball at Kentridge High School and Washington State University, where he was a pitcher and played the outfield from 1987 to 1989. He was drafted in 1989 by the Philadelphia Phillies, as an outfielder.  While pursuing a career as a professional baseball player, Urbon completed his education, graduating cum laude from WSU in 1990 with a B.A. in English.

Urbon played minor league baseball for the Batavia Clippers (1987), Spartanburg Phillies (1988), Clearwater Phillies (1988–1989) and Reno Silver Sox (1989).  Urbon tore the anterior cruciate ligament in his right knee while playing for the Silver Sox, which prematurely ended his playing career.

Sports agent

Urbon is a Co-Head of CAA Sports’ Baseball division, along with Nez Balelo, Jeff Berry, Greg Landry, and Brodie Van Wagenen.

Personal life

Urbon resides with his wife, Katherine, and three young children in Manhattan Beach, CA.

References 

Edes, Gordon. "Sox source: Bay still prime target", ESPN.com, Bristol, Connecticut, 3 December 2009. Retrieved on 2011-02-25.

External links

CAA Sports
Sox source: Bay still prime target
Gammons: How Cabrera, Sizemore grew up
What happened with Jason Bay and the Red Sox
In Defense of Jason Bay's Defense
Cleveland locks up another youngster in Sizemore
Mill Creek's Travis Snider grows up fast in life and baseball
Ballplayer turned sports agent Joe Urbon covers all the bases for his talented clients.
Agent draws on NW roots

1968 births
Living people
American sports agents
Batavia Clippers players
Spartanburg Phillies players
Clearwater Phillies players
Reno Silver Sox players
Washington State University alumni
Baseball players from Seattle